is a Japanese former Nippon Professional Baseball pitcher.

References 

1975 births
Living people
Baseball people from Ōita Prefecture 
Japanese baseball players
Nippon Professional Baseball pitchers
Fukuoka Daiei Hawks players
Fukuoka SoftBank Hawks players
Yomiuri Giants players